Ode To Gallantry, also known as Hap Haak Hang, is a 1982 Hong Kong film based on Louis Cha's novel of the same title. The film was produced by the Shaw Brothers Studio, directed by Chang Cheh and starred the Venom Mob. Formerly one of the rarest Venom Mob martial arts films available, it has been digitally remastered and released by Celestial Pictures.

Cast
Philip Kwok as Shi Potian / Shi Zhongyu
Wen Hsueh-erh as Ding Dang
Yau Chui-ling as Shi Jian
Tang Ching as Shi Qing
Lau Wai-ling as Min Rou
Sun Chien as Bei Haishi
Wong Lik as Xie Yanke
Yeung Chi-hing as Ding Busan
Jim Sam as Bai Wanjian
Yeung Hung as Feng Wanli
Wong Wai-wai as Hua Wanzi
Yu Tai-ping as Zhu Hengye
Teresa Ha as Mei Fanggu
Chiang Sheng as White Tiger
Chu Ko as Green Dragon
Cheng Tien-chi as Red Bird

See also
Ode to Gallantry (1985 TV series)
Ode to Gallantry (1989 TV series)
Ode to Gallantry (2002 TV series)

External links

1982 films
Films based on works by Jin Yong
Hong Kong martial arts films
Shaw Brothers Studio films
Works based on Ode to Gallantry
Wuxia films
Films directed by Chang Cheh
1980s Hong Kong films